The Breda-Zappata B.Z.308 was an Italian four-engined airliner produced by Breda.

Design and development
The B.Z.308 was a four-engined civil transport developed in the late 1940s for operation over both European and transatlantic routes. A large low-wing monoplane of all-metal construction, it was powered by four Bristol Centaurus radial engines driving five-bladed propellers. It had a large tailplane with endplate fins and rudders, and had retractable landing gear. The fuselage, oval in cross-section, accommodated a flight crew of five and 55 passengers in two cabins; a high-density model was planned with seats for 80.

Construction began during 1946, under aircraft designer Filippo Zappata at Breda's Sesto San Giovanni works. The Allied Commission halted the work, which was not resumed until January 1947. Further delays in the delivery of Bristol Centaurus engines delayed the first flight, which was on 27 August 1948, piloted by Mario Stoppani. Although flight testing went well, the project was abandoned as a result of financial problems, anticipated competition from American airliners in the postwar market, and pressure (under the Marshall plan) to close down Breda's aeronautical section. Breda subsequently stopped producing aircraft entirely.

Operational history
The prototype B.Z.308 was acquired by the Italian Air Force in 1949 as a transport aircraft (MM61802). Despite orders in 1950 from India, Argentina and Persia, only the prototype was built, allegedly also due to pressure from the allies for Italy to refrain from competing in civilian aircraft manufacture after the war.

On 27 August 1948 the Bz 308 made its maiden flight in front of civil and military authorities, politicians and the Italian President. The prototype, which passed to the Italian Air Force in 1950, was used to fly between Rome and Mogadishu until 21 February 1954, when it was damaged beyond repair by a collision with a cement truck, and was abandoned in a field in Somalia before being broken up.

It was also the first Italian transatlantic aircraft, and the first aircraft to fly into the new Malpensa airport in 1948.

The aircraft has a brief appearance in the 1953 movie Roman Holiday

Operators

 Italian Air Force

Specifications (B.Z.308)

See also
 Filippo Zappata

References

Sources

 
 

BZ.308
1940s Italian airliners
1940s Italian military transport aircraft
Four-engined tractor aircraft
Aircraft first flown in 1948
Low-wing aircraft
Four-engined piston aircraft